Brad Parker may refer to:

 Brad Parker (soccer) (born 1980), Canadian soccer player
 Brad Parker (artist) (born 1961), American cartoonist and painter
 Brad Parker (rugby league) (born 1997), Australian rugby league footballer

See also
 Bradley Parker (born 1970), English cricketer